Florence Dawson may refer to:

 The real name of English dancer and impersonator Florence Desmond
 A pen name of English writer Frances Julia Wedgwood